Rhys Nanmor (fl. 1480–1513) was a Welsh language poet who lived in Nanmor, near Beddgelert in North Wales.

Among his surviving work is a prophecy to King Henry VII of England and an elegy on the death of Arthur, Prince of Wales, who died in 1502.

Rhys was a family poet of Sir Rhys ap Thomas, and is thought to have been the bardic pupil of Dafydd Nanmor.

References
Thomas Roberts and Ifor Williams, The poetical works of Dafydd Nanmor, Cardiff, 1923

External links
A biography

Welsh-language poets
16th-century Welsh poets
16th-century male writers